Sir Richard Meade, 3rd Baronet (1697 – 26 May 1744) was an Anglo-Irish politician. 

Meade was the second eldest surviving son of Sir John Meade, 1st Baronet and Hon. Elizabeth Butler. He was a graduate of Trinity College Dublin.

He sat in the Irish House of Commons as the Member of Parliament for Kinsale from 1725 until his death in 1744.

In July 1711 he succeeded to his elder brother's baronetcy. In 1736 Meade married Catherine Prittie, daughter of Henry Prittie and Elizabeth Harrison. He was succeed in his title by his eldest son John Meade, who was raised to the Peerage of Ireland in 1766.

References

1697 births
1744 deaths
18th-century Anglo-Irish people
Alumni of Trinity College Dublin
Baronets in the Baronetage of Ireland
Irish MPs 1715–1727
Irish MPs 1727–1760
Members of the Parliament of Ireland (pre-1801) for County Cork constituencies